is a district of Setagaya, Tokyo, Japan.

Education
Setagaya Board of Education operates public elementary and junior high schools.

1 and 2-chome are zoned to Tamagawa Elementary School (玉川小学校). 3, 4, and parts of 5-chome are zoned to Nakamachi Elementary School (中町小学校). Other parts of 5-chome are zoned to Sakuramachi Elementary School (桜町小学校). 1-4 chome and parts of 5 chome are zoned to Tamagawa Junior High School (玉川中学校), while other parts of 5-chome are zoned to Fukasawa Junior High School (深沢中学校).

References

Districts of Setagaya